The western hemispingus (Sphenopsis ochracea) is a species of bird in the family Thraupidae. It is found in Ecuador and Colombia. Its natural habitats are subtropical or tropical moist montane forests and heavily degraded former forest.

References

western hemispingus
western hemispingus
western hemispingus
western hemispingus